Roman Petrovych Bezsmertnyi (born 15 November 1965 in Makariv Raion of Kyiv Oblast, Soviet Union) is a Ukrainian politician, member of Verkhovna Rada (parliament) for four convocations (terms) from 1994 to 2007, deputy head of Ukrainian president's secretariat and former Ambassador of Ukraine to Belarus. Bezsmertnyi is also (in 2005) a former Deputy Prime Minister of Ukraine, responsible for administrative and territorial reform.

Political career
After graduating Kyiv University, Bezsmertnyi became a school history teacher in Makariv. Soon after Ukraine gained independence he switched to politics and made a successful career within the Ukrainian Republican Party, becoming its member of parliament in 1994. Later he left the party but continued his career as a member of parliament. From 2002 to 2006 he was a member of the parliamentary Committee for State Development and Local Self-Governance.

Bezsmertnyi was one of the leaders of the 2004 Orange Revolution. After Viktor Yuschenko's victory on the 2004 presidential elections, Bezsmertnyi became the main organizer of the People's Union "Our Ukraine" party. The "Our Ukraine"s formal chair is Yuschenko himself, so Bezsmertnyi, as the Head of party's Political Council, became its factual leader.

In 2005 Bezsmertnyi was Deputy Prime Minister of Ukraine, responsible for administrative and territorial reform, in the first Tymoshenko government.

On 19 February 2008, Bezsmertny resigned from the "Our Ukraine" party. In a joint statement (with people's deputies, Mykhaylo Polyanchych, Ihor Kryl, Viktor Topolov, Oksana Bilozir and Vasyl Petevka) Bezsmertny declared that: "some of the leaders of the party play their own game, coming from personal interests and it has nothing to do with responsibility, pluralism, and norms of democracy."

In mid-April 2009, he rejoined the People's Union "Our Ukraine", stating: “To be acting head of the executive committee and not to be a member of the party is not right in relation to the people I am working with”.

From February 24, 2010 till June 3, 2011 Bezsmertnyi was Ambassador of Ukraine to Belarus.

In July 2014, he became the party leader of Third Ukrainian Republic.

Bezsmertnyi was Ukraine's representative to the political subgroup of the Trilateral Contact Group on Ukraine of the Russo-Ukrainian War until May 2016.

From March 2016 until January 2018 Bezsmertnyi was one of the party leaders of the Agrarian Party of Ukraine.

Bezsmertnyi declared his candidacy in the 2019 Ukrainian presidential election on 31 May 2018. In these election Hrytsenko did not proceed to the second round of the election; in the first round he gained 0.14% of the votes.

In December 2018 Bezsmertnyi announced the creation of a new party late January 2019.

President Volodymyr Zelensky has authorised Bezsmertnyi to represent Ukraine in the working political subgroup at the Trilateral Contact Group on a Donbas settlement.

See also
Politics of Ukraine
Verkhovna Rada
Cabinet of Ministers of Ukraine
Our Ukraine

References

External links 

1965 births
Living people
People from Kyiv Oblast
Ukrainian Republican Party politicians
Our Ukraine (political party) politicians
Vice Prime Ministers of Ukraine
Second convocation members of the Verkhovna Rada
Third convocation members of the Verkhovna Rada
Fourth convocation members of the Verkhovna Rada
Fifth convocation members of the Verkhovna Rada

Ambassadors of Ukraine to Belarus
People's Democratic Party (Ukraine) politicians
Third Ukrainian Republic (party) politicians
Agrarian Party of Ukraine politicians
Candidates in the 2019 Ukrainian presidential election